Honorius Augustodunensis (c. 1080 – c. 1140), commonly known as Honorius of Autun, was a very popular 12th-century Christian theologian who wrote prolifically on many subjects. He wrote in a non-scholastic manner, with a lively style, and his works were approachable for the lay community in general. He was, therefore, something of a popularizer of clerical learning.

Life
Very little is known of his life. He says that he is Honorius Augustodunensis ecclesiae presbyter et scholasticus, but nothing else is known. "Augustodunensis" was taken to mean Autun (Augustodunum), but that identification is now generally rejected. However, there is no solid reasoning for any other identification (such as Augst/Augustodunensem praesulem near Basle, Augsburg/Augusta Vindelicorum in Swabia, or Augustinensis, from St Augustine's Abbey at Canterbury), so his by-name has stuck. It is certain that he was a monk and that he traveled to England and was a student of Anselm's for some time. Toward the end of his life, he was in the Scots Monastery, Regensburg, Bavaria, probably living as a recluse.

Works

Among Honorius's works are:
Elucidarium: a survey of Christian beliefs (written in England). It was translated frequently into vernacular.
Sigillum sanctae Mariae: a set of lessons for how to celebrate the Assumption, together with a commentary on The Song of Songs, which he sees as being principally about Mary.
Gemma animae: An allegorical view of the liturgy and its practices.
 A commentary on The Song of Songs, (preserved in a manuscript from c. 1170).
A long commentary on the Psalms.
Clavis physicae, the first part (1-315) is a summary of the first four books of Johannes Scotus Erigena Periphyseon (De divisione naturae), the second part (316-529) is a reproduction of the fifth book.
De luminaribus ecclesiae: a bibliography of Christian authors, which ends with a list of twenty-one of his own works.

His most important work was the Imago mundi, an encyclopedia of popular cosmology and geography combined with a chronicle of world history. It was translated into many different vernacular languages and was popular throughout the medieval period. It contained, among other things, a scheme for the operation of guardian angels.

A major scholar of Honorius is Valerie Flint, whose essays on him are collected in Ideas in the Medieval West: Texts and their Contexts (London, 1988). See also her study of Honorius in Constant J. Mews and Valerie I. J. Flint, Peter Abelard; Honorius of Regensburg (Aldershot, 1995).

Notes

Bibliography
 Honorius Augustodunensis, Clavis physicae, critical edition of the first part (§§ 1–315) and introduction (in Italian) by Paolo Lucentini, Roma: Edizioni di Storia e Letteratura, 1974
 Honorius Augustodunensis, La «Clavis physicae» (316–529) di Honorius Augustodunensis. Studio e edizione, critical edition of the second part (§§ 316–529) and introduction (in Italian) by Pasquale Arfé, Napoli: Liguori 2012.
 The Oxford Dictionary of the Christian Church, edited by F. A. Cross, .
 Graeme Dunphy, "Historical Writing in and after the Old High German period" in Brian Murdoch, German Literature of the Early Middle Ages,  2004, 201–25.

External links 
 

1151 deaths
12th-century French Catholic theologians
Medieval geographers
12th-century Latin writers
1080s births